Ewan is an anglicisation of the Scottish Gaelic name Eòghann. It is possibly a derivative of the Pictish name, Vuen (or 'Wen'), "The Warrior" or  "born of the mountain". It is most common as a male  given name in Scotland and Canada. It is also, less commonly, a surname, especially among the Scottish Clans, examples of variation in spelling include McEwan’s beer and MacEwan University.

Owain is the predominant Welsh spelling of the name (or Owen when Anglicized), but Iwan and Iuan are also found, as they are in Cornish. Ouen can be considered the French or Breton spelling of the name. Another meaning of these could mean Yew Tree or ‘well born’ in Celtic languages.

Ewan is also a Latin word meaning Bacchus. Ewan is sometimes incorrectly seen as a cognate to John and its variations. Ewen or Ewan is also a Scottish surname, as in Clan MacEwen.

People with the given name

In the arts and media
Ewan Christian (1814–1895), British architect
Ewan MacColl (1915–1989), British folk singer-songwriter
Ewan McGregor (born 1971), Scottish actor
Ewan Mitchell (born 1997), English actor
Ewan Stewart (born 1957), Scottish actor

In sports
Ewan MacDonald (born 1975), Scottish curler
Ewan McGrady, Australian rugby league footballer
Ewan Thompson (born 1977), Australian (Australian rules) footballer

In other fields
Ewan Birney (born 1972), British bioinformatician
Ewan Anderson (born 1938), expert on geopolitics, economic and social geography

Characters
Ewan, a character from the TV series Merlin Season 1 Episode 2
Ewan O'Hara, Juliet O'Hara's brother on the TV series Psych
Ewan, a guard in the book The Wizard's Child
Ewan Doherty, Head of English in Teachers, a UK Channel 4 show 
Ewan the Dream Sheep, a popular baby sleeping toy
Ewan Cameron, a minor character in Dragonfly in Amber, second book in the Outlander series by Diana Gabaldon
Ewan Zschoch

See also
Eógan
Eógan (given name)
Iwan (name)
Euan
Evan
MacEwen

References

Irish masculine given names
Scottish masculine given names